Boesenbergia rotunda (Thai: กระชาย krachai, Khmer: ខ្ជាយ k'jeay, Indonesian: temu kunci), commonly known as Chinese keys, fingerroot, lesser galangal or Chinese ginger, is a medicinal and culinary herb from China and Southeast Asia. In English, the root has traditionally been called fingerroot, because the shape of the rhizome resembles that of fingers growing out of a center piece.

Fingerroot is a kind of ginger (Zingiberaceae). It is an annual crop and indigenous to southern Yunnan Province, China, to west Malaysia, growing in tropical rain forest. It has an underground stem, known as a rhizome. This spreads into many bunches in the same way as banana, ginger, galangal and turmeric. These structures accumulate nutrients and the middle part is more swollen than the head and bottom part. The inner part has a range of colours and aromas depending on the variety of fingerroot. The above-ground part is composed of a leaf stalk that has a sheath covering it. The leaf sheaths are red, the blades are oval in shape and the apex of leaves are sharp. The middle of the petioles are deeply grooved. The flower appears between the leaf sheaths at the bottom of the trunk. The petals are white or light pink. Flowers bloom one at a time.

Common names
 Khmer: kcheay (ខ្ជាយ)
 Indonesian: temu kunci
 Meitei: yai-macha
 Sinhalese: haran kaha (හරං කහ)
 Thai: krachai (กระชาย)
 Vietnamese: ngải bún, nga truật

Uses

Fingerroot is known as temu kunci in Indonesian. It is widely used in Javanese cuisine in Indonesia.

In addition to its culinary uses, it is also specifically used as a spice, or as flavoring agents, dyes, or also traditional medicine. After its discovery, B. rotunda has been used as research material in rat studies and microbiological studies (see Research and Studies section).

In Thai cooking, fingerroot is called krachai and is an ingredient in dishes such as kaeng tai pla. It is used in some kroeung pastes of Cambodian cuisine and is known as k'cheay. In the west it is usually found pickled or frozen. The rhizomes are commonly used as vegetables in main dishes or eaten raw when young. It is also used to help make fermented soya bean cake, also called tempeh, a traditional Indonesian food. Its roots and rhizomes are cultivated in Indonesia, Indochina, and India in small homes and is also popularly used in flavorful curry dishes. Fingerroot is also incorporated into tonic mixtures such as the famous Indonesian tonic jamu.

It is sometimes confused with Alpinia officinarum, another plant in the family Zingiberaceae which is also known as lesser galangal.

See also
Alpinia galanga
Domesticated plants and animals of Austronesia
Hedychium spicatum
Zingiber spectabile

References

External links
Gernot Katzer's Spice PagesFingerroot

Medicinal plants of Asia
Zingiberoideae
Spices